Periklis Bousinakis (born 23 April 1986) is a Greek professional footballer who plays as an attacking midfielder for Ilisiakos.

Bousinakis emerged from the football academy of Panathinaikos. He later played for Kerkyra in Beta Ethniki, and had also a loan spell at AB of Denmark.

References

1986 births
Living people
Greek footballers
Panetolikos F.C. players
Apollon Smyrnis F.C. players
A.O. Kerkyra players
Ethnikos Piraeus F.C. players
Akademisk Boldklub players
Association football midfielders
Footballers from Volos